"I Am the Night—Color Me Black" is episode 146 of the American television anthology series The Twilight Zone. It originally aired on March 27, 1964 on CBS.

Opening narration

Plot
Sheriff Koch cannot sleep the night before the execution of a man, as he feels conflicted about the situation.  His wife Ella (Eve McVeagh) is no comfort as she snarls, "What time do they string him up; you know what I mean...what time does he get hung?"  Her attitude represents the hateful sentiment of the town that looks forward to the fate of Jagger, a man who is to be hanged after being wrongfully convicted of killing a bigot; he claims self defense, and is unrepentant about the killing.  On the day of his execution, the sun does not rise in the morning, and it seems that this is the only place in the world where this is true.

There is still some dispute as to whether Jagger is guilty.  The sheriff is conflicted, while the deputy is convinced Jagger is guilty; the latter is accused of perjury by the town news reporter. That morning the Deputy becomes loud and obnoxious, and the sheriff tells him: "You better unravel it Pierce, or I'll spread you all over this yard". At 9:00 AM, just before the hanging,  it is still dark; the radio now reporting the darkness confined to this one small village.  The sheriff admits he feels guilty because he didn't question the lack of autopsy of the victim, and didn't care that there were powder burns on the victim despite the deputy testifying that Jagger shot the victim from across a room.  The sheriff wanted to be reelected, and as such went along with the status quo.

However, Jagger is hanged anyway at 9:30, much to the delight of the town.  The town clergyman, although a different faith and race than Jagger, steps in and says that he is thankful to him for having stood up for him and his kind.  The clergyman asks if Jagger had felt hate and enjoyment when he killed the man. Jagger confirmed he did. After this, the clergyman also reluctantly agrees to the execution, proclaiming that Jagger was in fact guilty.  Jagger is disheartened, saying “It’s important to get with the majority isn’t it? That’s a big thing nowadays isn’t it, Reverend?” The Reverend replies: "The majority is all there is". After the hanging, the deputy says that for having gone along with the execution, that the clergyman has "seen the light". The clergyman replies that the sky is black because of all the hatred in the world, namely the hatred surrounding Jagger's execution.  The sky becomes even darker after the execution.  The deputy is convinced that the darkness is nothing more than fog, which will eventually lift, but neither the sheriff or reporter are convinced.

Later, a radio broadcast reveals that the town is not the only place where this disturbance is happening. The sky has turned dark over North Vietnam, a section of the Berlin Wall, a political prison in Budapest, a section of Dallas (Dallas, where President Kennedy was fatally shot), and other places around the world where hatred runs rampant.

Closing narration

Cast
Michael Constantine as Sheriff Charlie Koch 
Paul Fix as Colbey 
George Lindsey as Deputy Pierce
Ivan Dixon as the Reverend Anderson
Terry Becker as Jagger 
Eve McVeagh as Ella 
Douglas Bank as Man 
Russell Custer as Townsman
Elizabeth Harrower as Woman 
Michael Jeffers as Deputy
Robert McCord as Townsman 
Ward Wood as Man

Production notes
Serling wrote this script primarily as his personal reaction to the assassination of President John F. Kennedy on November 22, 1963. Indeed, mention is made in the story of "a street in Dallas, Texas" (where Kennedy was murdered as his motorcade traveled down Elm Street in Dallas' Dealey Plaza) as being enveloped by the strange darkness.

The episode is similar to "Many, Many Monkeys", a script written for Twilight Zone by its producer, William Froug, but never shot. In that script an epidemic breaks out in which afflicted persons' eyes seal shut as folds of flesh grow over them. Though a nuclear explosion is initially blamed, one character proposes that it is a physical manifestation of hate that is blinding them. The network bought the script but then shelved it, finding its subject matter too disturbing, but it was eventually produced in 1989, during the first revival of Twilight Zone.

Years earlier, Serling had written a teleplay for Playhouse 90 called "A Town Has Turned to Dust", about the 1870 lynching of an innocent Mexican man in a Southwestern town. This story was based on the Emmett Till case, and Serling had to deal with executive interference and network censors before the episode could air.

References

DeVoe, Bill. (2008). Trivia from The Twilight Zone. Albany, GA: Bear Manor Media. 
Grams, Martin. (2008). The Twilight Zone: Unlocking the Door to a Television Classic. Churchville, MD: OTR Publishing. 
Zicree, Marc Scott: The Twilight Zone Companion. Sillman-James Press, 1982 (second edition)

External links

1964 American television episodes
The Twilight Zone (1959 TV series season 5) episodes
Television episodes written by Rod Serling
Fiction set in 1964
Television episodes directed by Abner Biberman